Coach Trip 18, also known as Coach Trip: Road to Barcelona is the eighteenth series of Coach Trip in the United Kingdom. The series was confirmed by E4 in 2018 with filming taking place between 6 May 2018 and 8 July 2018, before the filming started on Celebrity Coach Trip: Road to Benidorm. The series aired for 30 episodes from 28 January 2019 to 8 March 2019.

Contestants

Voting history

Notes
 On Day 3, David left the coach before the vote, as she was a solo traveller Jasmine remained on the coach and at the evenings vote the couples could vote for her. She received her second yellow card after getting 4 votes and was eliminated from the trip.

 On Day 4, Cem & Nuriye and Goffy & James were banned from voting due to unacceptable behaviour the previous night. Cem & Nuriye would subsequently receive their first yellow card at the vote.

 On Day 5, Brendan announced that there would be a twist in the vote every Friday.

 On Day 5, Brendan announced that the couple that received the yellow card at the evenings vote would choose another couple to give immunity to at Day 6's vote, Ali & Kat were given the yellow card and granted Cem & Nuriye immunity, meaning they would be immune from the vote for the second consecutive day.

 On Day 10, Brendan announced that the winners of the morning activity, would be able to cast a double vote. Dec & Isaac, Jess & Kiana and Kyle & Milan won the activity, therefore their votes were counted twice.

 On Day 13, Jess & Kiana left the coach as they were outraged that Cem & Nuriye had been voted off.

 On Day 15, Brendan announced that the couple with the most votes would win three days immunity. This ended up being Isaac & Dec.

 On Day 20, Brendan announced that the couple that received a yellow card at the vote would be able to select another couple to automatically receive a yellow card. Amelia & Luca received their second yellow card and chose Jamie & Louis to receive their first yellow card.

 On Day 25, Brendan announced that all couples would vote as normal, however only one  couple's vote selected at random would count, and that the couple they had voted for would receive a yellow card. This ended up being Annabel & Rachel's vote, sending Jamie & Louis home.

 On Day 26, Brendan announced that there would be a twist in every vote this week.

 On Day 26, Brendan announced that the couple with the most votes would win immunity until the end of the trip. Kamesha & Shanice received the most votes and received immunity for the rest of the trip.

 On Day 27, Brendan announced that the couple with the most votes would receive an instant red card. This ended up being Danii & Kay, who subsequently stormed out during the vote.

 On Day 28, Brendan announced that the couple with the most votes would win immunity until the end of the trip, as well as this, the couple with the most votes would also choose another couple to win immunity until the end of the trip also. Andy & James and Isaac & Dec received immunity for the rest of the trip.

 On Day 29, Brendan announced that the couple with the most votes would win immunity until the end of the trip, as well as this, the couple with the most votes would also choose a couple to receive an instant red card. Charley & Charlie received immunity and they sent Annabel & Rachel home.

The trip by day

References

Coach Trip series
2019 British television seasons
Television shows set in Croatia
Television shows set in Italy
Television shows set in Spain